Dacyl Pérez (born 3 June 1959) is a Venezuelan former swimmer. She competed in three events at the 1976 Summer Olympics.

References

1959 births
Living people
Venezuelan female swimmers
Olympic swimmers of Venezuela
Swimmers at the 1976 Summer Olympics
Place of birth missing (living people)
20th-century Venezuelan women